Acaxee was a tribe or group of tribes in the Sierra Madre Occidental in eastern Sinaloa and NW Durango. They spoke a Taracahitic language in the Southern Uto-Aztecan language family.  Their culture was based on horticulture and the exploitation of wild animal and plant life. They are now extinct as an identifiable ethnic group.

History
In December 1601, the Acaxees, under the direction of an elder named Perico, began an uprising against Spanish rule. This revolt was called the Acaxee Rebellion.  They are said to have been converted to the Catholic faith by the society of Jesuits in 1602. Early accounts by Jesuit missionaries allege continual warfare and cannibalism among the Tepehuan, Acaxee, and Xixime who inhabited Nueva Vizcaya. 
Ethnographer Ralph Beals reported in the early 1930s that the Acaxee tribe from western Mexico played a ball game called "vatey [or] batey" on "a small plaza, very flat, with walls at the sides".

Subdivisions
Acaxee (proper)
Sabaibo
Tebaca
Papudo
Tecaya

Notes

References
Beals, Ralph L. 1933. The Acaxee:  a Mountain Tribe of Durango and Sinaloa.

Further reading
 Deeds, Susan. Defiance and Deference in Mexico's Colonial North: Indians Under Spanish Rule in Nueva Vizcaya. (2003) University of Texas Press, Austin, TX. 

Indigenous peoples of Aridoamerica
Indigenous peoples in Mexico
Peoples of the Sierra Madre Occidental
Durango
Sinaloa
Cannibalism in North America
Extinct ethnic groups